Douglas Payne (1875 in England – 3 August 1965 in London, England) was a British actor of the silent era.

Selected filmography
 Maria Marten (1913)
 The Harbour Lights (1914)
 In the Ranks (1914)
 Enoch Arden (1914)
 The Little Minister (1915)
 The Romany Rye (1915)
 Master and Man (1915)
 Flying from Justice (1915)
 Fine Feathers (1915)
 The Coal King (1915)
 The Stronger Will (1916)
 A Lass o' the Looms (1919)
 The Heart of a Rose (1919)
 Rodney Stone (1920)
 Won by a Head (1920)
 Potter's Clay (1922)
 Old Bill Through the Ages (1924)
 The Man Who Changed His Name (1928)
 What Next? (1928)
 Red Aces (1929)
 You'd Be Surprised! (1930)
 The Flaw (1933)

References

External links
 

1875 births
1965 deaths
English male film actors
English male silent film actors
20th-century English male actors